Gunnar A. Hagemann (1877–1971) was a Danish philatelist who was added to the Roll of Distinguished Philatelists in 1955.

References

Signatories to the Roll of Distinguished Philatelists
1877 births
1971 deaths
Danish philatelists